Jule Britt Selbo is an American screenwriter, playwright, author, producer and professor. She was born in Fargo, North Dakota. She is currently a Professor in the Cinema and Television Arts Department at California State University, Fullerton and is a member of the WGA.

Education
Selbo attended Southern Methodist University and obtained her B.F.A. She continued her educational path into graduate school and received her M.F.A. from the University of North Carolina and her Ph.D. from the University of Exeter for her work in Film Genre.

Career
Selbo has worked with industry pioneers like George Lucas, Roland Joffe, Lauren Shuler-Donner, Michael Newell, Aaron Spelling and with all the major Hollywood Studios. She was involved in screenwriting and producing works in feature film, television, animated series and daytime dramas for Columbia Pictures, Paramount, Universal and HBO.

Selbo has written animated films for the Jim Henson Company and Walt Disney Studios, notably work on Ariel’s Beginning, Cinderella II and The Hunchback of Notre Dame II.

Publications
Selbo has written books for screenwriters on screenwriting structure and film genre as well as on film history including Women Screenwriters: An International Guide and Film Genre for Screenwriters.

She is a co-editor of the Journal of Screenwriting (Intellect Press) since 2008 until current day. She has also written for theatre with productions in New York, Los Angeles, Louisville and other theaters in the USA.

Filmography

Producer

Writer

References

External links 
 

Year of birth missing (living people)
Living people
Alumni of the University of Exeter
American television producers
American television writers
Animation screenwriters
California State University, Fullerton faculty
Screenwriting instructors
Screenwriters from California
Southern Methodist University alumni
University of North Carolina alumni
American women television writers
21st-century American women